William Edward McCreary Sr. (December 2, 1934 – November 25, 2019) was an ice hockey left winger, coach and general manager. He played in the National Hockey League with the New York Rangers, Detroit Red Wings, Montreal Canadiens and the St. Louis Blues from between 1953 and 1971, and then coached in the league with the Blues, Vancouver Canucks, and California Golden Seals between 1971 and 1975. After stepping down as coach of the Golden Seals he served as their general manager from 1975 to 1977, including their first year as the Cleveland Barons.

Early life
McCreary was born in Sundridge, Ontario.

Career
During his pro career, McCreary played for the New York Rangers, Detroit Red Wings, Montreal Canadiens and the St. Louis Blues. He later coached the Vancouver Canucks for the first half of the 1973–74 season and then became general manager of the California Golden Seals in August 1974. Although the Seals were performing fairly well, McCreary did not like the coaching methods of Marshall Johnston, and fired Johnston on January 22, 1975, taking over the position himself. He hired Jack Evans, who had coached their minor league affiliate the Salt Lake Golden Eagles, as coach the following year, while remaining as general manager. The team moved to Cleveland in 1976 and became the Cleveland Barons. Yet, the club struggled and McCreary was fired as general manager in January 1977, and was replaced by Harry Howell, who had been serving as the assistant general manager.

He was the elder brother of Keith McCreary, also an NHL left winger. His son Bill McCreary Jr. played 12 games in the NHL with the Toronto Maple Leafs during the 1980–81 season. He is also the brother-in-law of Ron Attwell.

McCreary died on November 25, 2019.

Awards and achievements
WHL Prairie Division Second All-Star Team (1957)
CPHL First All-Star Team (1964, 1966)

Career statistics

Regular season and playoffs

Coaching record

References

Bibliography

External links
 

 

1934 births
2019 deaths
California Golden Seals executives
California Golden Seals coaches
Canadian ice hockey coaches
Canadian ice hockey left wingers
Cleveland Barons (NHL)
Detroit Red Wings players
Edmonton Flyers (WHL) players
Guelph Biltmore Mad Hatters players
Hershey Bears players
Houston Apollos players
Hull-Ottawa Canadiens players
Ice hockey people from Ontario
Montreal Canadiens players
New York Rangers players
Omaha Knights (CHL) players
People from Parry Sound District
Providence Reds players
St. Louis Blues coaches
St. Louis Blues players
Saskatoon Quakers players
Springfield Indians players
Toronto Marlboros players
Vancouver Canucks coaches